Krista Schmidinger (born 18 May 1970 in Pittsfield, Massachusetts) is an American former alpine skier who competed in the 1992 Winter Olympics and 1994 Winter Olympics.

External links
 sports-reference.com
 

1970 births
Living people
American female alpine skiers
Olympic alpine skiers of the United States
Alpine skiers at the 1992 Winter Olympics
Alpine skiers at the 1994 Winter Olympics
21st-century American women
Sportspeople from Pittsfield, Massachusetts